Sarıkonak can refer to:

 Sarıkonak, Bitlis
 Sarıkonak, İliç
 Sarıkonak, Karaisalı